Hilal Amel Moustakbel Riadhi Annaba, or simply HAMR Annaba, commonly called HAMRA Annaba is an Algerian football club based in Annaba. The club was founded on 1944 and its colours are red and white. Their home stadium, Colonel Abdelkader Chabou Stadium, has a capacity of 10,000 spectators. The club is currently playing in the Ligue Régional I.

History
From 1944 to the independence of Algeria, the club played under the name of Union Sportive Musulmane de Bône (USM Bône). From 1964 to 1971 the team changed the name to Union Sportive Musulmane d'Annaba (USM Annaba), not to be confused with the current USM Annaba (Union Sportive Médinat d'Annaba) (a new team created in 1983), the club won its first Algerian Championnat National.

In 1972, Hamra Annaba won its first Algerian Cup in the club's history by beating USM Alger 2–0 in the final.

The club came eighth in the 2009–10 Ligue Inter-Régions de football – Groupe Est. The club was promoted for the 2010–11 season of the newly created Championnat National de Football Amateur due to the professionalisation of the first two divisions in Algeria.

Crest

Honours
Algerian Championnat National: 1
Winner: 1964

 Algerian Cup: 1
Winner: 1972

References

External links
Hamra Annaba profile

Annaba
Football clubs in Algeria
1944 establishments in Algeria
Association football clubs established in 1934